"A Day in the Life of a Tree" is a song by American rock band the Beach Boys from their 1971 album Surf's Up. It was written by Brian Wilson and the group's manager Jack Rieley, who also performed lead vocal. The lyrics were inspired by Wilson's feelings toward environmental pollution.

Background and inspiration

Wilson's 2016 memoir, I Am Brian Wilson, states of "A Day in the Life of a Tree"

According to Rieley,

AllMusic interpreted the song's subject to be autobiographical, calling it "one of Brian's most deeply touching and bizarre compositions…lamenting his long life amid the pollution and grime of a city park while the somber tones of a pipe organ build atmosphere." In his book The Beach Boys and the California Myth, David Leaf quoted an anonymous friend of Brian's saying that Brian was "choked up" after hearing Rieley's vocal performance of the song, because "he [Brian] really related to the song. It was about him."

Recording
The instrumental track was made in a few days. According to engineer Stephen Desper, the bird sounds were captured from Wilson's backyard at dawn. In 2015, Desper wrote of the song,

Desper recalled that Dennis Wilson was the first to try out the lead vocal.  Rieley said that Brian had first attempted singing the lead vocal, but appeared dissatisfied with his performance, and so he enlisted Rieley to "help" by singing an ostensible guide vocal. Rieley performed about 5 takes, after which Wilson declared that Rieley had just done the final lead vocal. Carl said that everybody involved had agreed Rieley was fit to sing the lead vocal, and had worked out a plan to trick him into singing it. In a 2010 interview, Andrew VanWyngarden stated that Al Jardine had told him that "no one would sing [the song] because it was too depressing, so the manager guy, Jack Rieley, sang it."

Warner Bros Records staff arranger Van Dyke Parks sang background vocals on the track. He elaborated to Rolling Stone in 1971:

Live performance
It was performed live only once by the Beach Boys, at the Long Beach Arena in Long Beach, CA on December 3, 1971. The bandmembers reportedly coaxed Brian out from the side of the stage to play organ while Rieley sang it. Rieley commented in a 2013 interview,

Recognition
Neil Young has briefly referred to "A Day in the Life of a Tree", saying "Brian's a genius…[It's a] great song, man." Music journalist Ian MacDonald referred to the song as "so radically at odds with pop's now ubiquitous irony that you either laugh or become humbled by its pained candour."

Personnel
Credits from Craig Slowinski

The Beach Boys
Al Jardine - lead (coda) and backing vocals
Bruce Johnston - backing vocals
Mike Love - backing vocals
Brian Wilson - backing vocals, harmonium, Moog synthesizer, temple blocks
Carl Wilson - backing vocals, acoustic guitars

Additional musicians
Daryl Dragon - pipe organs
Stephen W. Desper - bird sfx, Moog programming
Van Dyke Parks - lead vocals (coda)
Jack Rieley - lead vocals

Cover versions
 1996 – Matthew Sweet, Honor: A Benefit for the Honor the Earth Campaign
 Yo La Tengo

References

External links
 
 

1971 songs
The Beach Boys songs
Songs written by Brian Wilson
Songs written by Jack Rieley
Song recordings produced by the Beach Boys
Environmental songs